WKTG (93.9 FM) is a radio station broadcasting a rock format.  Licensed to Madisonville, Kentucky, United States, the station serves the Owensboro area.  The station is currently owned by Sound Broadcasters, Inc. and features programming from United Stations Radio Networks and Westwood One.

References

External links

KTG